Daniel Hofstetter (born 4 July 1992) is a German footballer who plays as a defender. He currently plays for TSV Ampfing.

Career

Hofstetter began his career with 1860 Munich, and was promoted to the reserve team in 2010. He played 43 times in the Regionalliga Süd over the next two years, and was given a squad number for the first-team but didn't make any appearances. In July 2012 he signed for SpVgg Unterhaching of the 3. Liga, alongside team-mates Marcel Kappelmaier and Marius Willsch. He left Unterhaching after two seasons.

External links

Daniel Hofstetter at FuPa

1992 births
Living people
German footballers
Germany youth international footballers
TSV 1860 Munich II players
SpVgg Unterhaching players
Eintracht Bamberg players
SV Wacker Burghausen players
3. Liga players
Regionalliga players
Association football central defenders